The following is a list of notable netball coaches in Australia.

National team head coaches
The following is a list of head coaches of the Australia national netball team.

Premiership winning coaches
The following is a list of head coaches who have guided teams to premierships.

Esso/Mobil Superleague

Commonwealth Bank Trophy

ANZ Championship

Suncorp Super Netball

Australian Netball Awards

Netball Australia Coach of the Year

Australian ANZ Championship Coach of the Year

Joyce Brown Coach of the Year
In 2014 Netball Australia introduced the Joyce Brown Coach of the Year award in honour of Joyce Brown.

Foxtel ANZ Championship All Star coaches

References

 
Coaches